Mohd. Aleem Khan was an Indian politician and a member of the 16th Legislative Assembly of India. He represented the Bulandshahr constituency of Uttar Pradesh and was a member of the Bahujan Samaj Party political party.

Early life and education
Mohd. Aleem Khan was born in Bulandshahr. He has not received any formal education and was literate.

Political career
Mohd. Aleem Khan had been a MLA for two terms. He represented the Bulandshahr constituency and was a member of the Bahujan Samaj Party political party.

He lost his seat in the 2017 Uttar Pradesh Assembly election to Virendra Singh of the Bharatiya Janata Party.

Posts Held

See also

 Bulandshahr (Assembly constituency)
 Sixteenth Legislative Assembly of Uttar Pradesh
 Uttar Pradesh Legislative Assembly

References 

Bahujan Samaj Party politicians from Uttar Pradesh
Uttar Pradesh MLAs 2007–2012
Uttar Pradesh MLAs 2012–2017
People from Bulandshahr district
1963 births
Living people